Ronald F. Collins is an American politician from Maine. A Wells resident, Collins formerly represented the second district in the Maine Senate. Prior to being elected a state senator, he was a member of the Maine House of Representatives representing Wells from 2002 to 2010.

Collins endorsed Mitt Romney for president in the 2012 election.

References

Year of birth missing (living people)
Living people
People from Wells, Maine
Republican Party members of the Maine House of Representatives
Republican Party Maine state senators
Businesspeople from Maine
21st-century American politicians